Pittsboro may refer to a place in the United States:

 Pittsboro, Indiana
 Pittsboro, Mississippi
 Pittsboro, North Carolina